The 1948 International cricket season was from April 1948 to August 1948.

Season overview

June

Test Trial in England

Australia in England

July

Ireland in Scotland

August

MCC in Netherlands

MCC in Ireland

England in Netherlands

September

Australia in Scotland

References

1948 in cricket